Rupert Hollaus (4 September 1931 – 11 September 1954) was an Austrian Grand Prix motorcycle road racer who competed for the NSU factory racing team. He is the only Austrian to win a road racing World Championship, and the first racer to do so posthumously.


Motorcycle racing career
Hollaus was born in Traisen, Austria. He began his Grand Prix racing career in the 1953 season. In the 1954 season, he dominated the 125cc class by winning the first four Grands Prix. His victory at the 1954 Isle of Man TT was notable because he was one of only seven riders to have won an Isle of Man TT race in their first attempt. Due to the circuit's 37.7 mile length, it usually takes competitors two or three attempts before they learn its nuances.

Later that same year, Hollaus was killed during practice for the Italian Grand Prix at Monza. Hollaus became the first posthumous World Champion in 1954, in the 125cc class and was runner up to his NSU teammate, Werner Haas, in the 250cc class.

On 23 February 1955 he was elected as "Austrian Sportspersonality of the year 1954" (posthum).

Motorcycle Grand Prix results 

(Races in italics indicate fastest lap)

References 

1931 births
1954 deaths
People from Lilienfeld District
Austrian motorcycle racers
125cc World Championship riders
250cc World Championship riders
Isle of Man TT riders
Motorcycle racers who died while racing
Sport deaths in Italy
Sportspeople from Lower Austria
125cc World Riders' Champions